The 5.6×39mm, also known in the U.S. as .220 Russian, is a cartridge developed in 1961 for deer hunting in the USSR. It fires a 5.6mm projectile from necked down 7.62×39mm brass. While it originally re-used 7.62x39 cases, once it became popular enough commercial ammunition started being manufactured, both in the USSR and in Finland. When it was introduced to the United States by SAKO it was stamped .220 Russian. Lapua later changed the designation to .220 Russian for the American market as well.

Soviet 5.6×39mm cartridges were loaded with smokeless powder VT (винтовочный пироксилиновый порох ВТ), as well as Soviet 7.62×54mmR and 9×53mmR hunting cartridges. It is the parent case for the .22 PPC, 6mm PPC, and the 6.5mm Grendel cartridges.

Ballistics 
From Wolf.

Firearms 
In the Soviet Union, several hunting rifles were designed for this cartridge; MBO-1 target rifle, bolt-action carbine «Bars», self-loading carbines MTs-127 (МЦ-127) and MTs-128 (МЦ-128), combination guns IZh-15, MTs-5-35 and MTs-105-01 (МЦ-105-01).

The TKB-022PM5 bullpup assault rifle, the IZh-94 "Sever", "Saiga-5.6" ("Сайга-5.6"), and "Saiga-5.6S" ("Сайга-5.6С") have been chambered in 5.6x39mm.

See also
List of rifle cartridges
5 mm caliber

References

Further reading
 5,6-мм охотничий патрон с высокой начальной скоростью пули // Спортивно-охотничье оружие и патроны. Бухарест, "Внешторгиздат", 1965. стр.134
 Патроны охотничьи 5,6x39. Типы и основные размеры. ГОСТ 20808-75. Москва, 1975.
 Патроны охотничьи 5,6x39 // Охотничье и спортивное оружие. М., Внешторгиздат. 1989.
 А. В. Кузьминский. Оружие для охотника: практическое пособие / под общ.ред. А. Е. Тараса М., ООО «Издательство АСТ», 2002. стр.250-251

Pistol and rifle cartridges
Wildcat cartridges

Nammo Lapua cartridges